Rusumo is a town in northwestern Tanzania, at the border with Rwanda. It sits across the Kagera River from Rusumo, Rwanda.

Location
Rusumo is a town in Ngara District, in the Kagera Region of Tanzania. The geographical coordinates of Rusumo, Tanzania are: 2°23'05.0"S, 30°47'01.0"E (Latitude:-2.384722; Longitude:30.783611).

Overview
Rusumo is described as a Rural Ward, one of twenty, in Ngara District. Rusumo Falls, on the Kagera River, lies across the river, partly within this town, and partly in neighboring Rusumo, Rwanda. Rusumo Hydroelectric Power Station, currently under construction, also partly lies within this location.

The town is served by a One-Stop-Border-Post (OSBP), housing both customs and immigration services of both countries, in one location. Arriving vehicles and passengers and their goods and luggage are processed once in one office by officers from both countries.

Transport
The main highway B3, from Isaka, passes through Rusumo, Tanzania, and enters Rusumo, Rwanda and continues to Kigali as Highway RN3. In 2014, Japanese and indigenous engineers and technicians completed the construction of the New Rusumo Bridge. The bridge, built with a grant of US$30 million, donated by the Japan International Cooperation Agency (JICA). The work included building the new bridge, access roads, truck parks and the OSBPs, housing immigration and customs areas in both countries.

Population
According to the 2012 national census the population of Rusumo Ward (Rusumo Rural), was enumerated at 12,925 people, of whom
6,428 (49.7 percent) were males and 6,497 (50.3 percent) were females.

References

External links
 About the Rusumo Falls Hydroelectric Project

Populated places in Kagera Region
Rwanda–Tanzania border crossings